I Dream is a British children's musical television comedy programme aimed at teenage audiences, which aired in 2004. It was set at an esteemed performing arts college near Barcelona, Spain, and focuses on 13 teenagers who are invited to enrol at the college, Avalon Heights, over the summer. All eight members of the pop group S Club 8 star in the show alongside five other young actors and actresses and Hollywood film actor Christopher Lloyd of Back to the Future fame.

I Dream has the members of S Club 8 playing supposedly exaggerated versions of themselves, albeit with identical names to their real life counterparts. Each episode of the show includes several (usually two or more) songs and dance numbers involving both members and non-members of the band. Cast member George Wood explained the show "a modern day Fame".

The series' production company was 19 Television, a subsidiary of the corporation 19 Management, which is owned by the show's executive producer, Simon Fuller. The first episode of I Dream aired on Wednesday 22 September 2004 on BBC One. From the week of 23 November episodes were aired on Thursday instead of Wednesday, and the thirteenth and final episode aired on 16 December and featured Laila Rouass. Reruns of the show in the UK were broadcast on the CBBC Channel.

Cast
Matt Di Angelo as Felix (13/13 Episodes)
Rachel Hyde-Harvey as Amy (13/13 Episodes)
Helen Kurup as Khush (13/13 Episodes)
Lorna Want as Natalie (13/13 Episodes)
George Wood as Ollie (13/13 Episodes)
Jay Asforis as Jay (13/13 Episodes)
Daisy Evans as Daisy (13/13 Episodes)
Calvin Goldspink as Calvin (13/13 Episodes)
Frankie Sandford as Frankie (13/13 Episodes)
Rochelle Wiseman as Rochelle (13/13 Episodes)
Stacey McClean as Stacey (13/13 Episodes)
Hannah Richings as Hannah (12/13 Episodes)
Aaron Renfree as Aaron (8/13 Episodes)
Christopher Lloyd as Professor Toone (13/13 Episodes)

Episodes
1."Why Me?" – 22 September 2004
Amy, Felix, Ollie, Natalie and Khush receive an invite to Avalon Heights - a top secret academy for the performing arts, where everybody who's ever been anybody has spent a summer. It's a dream come true but as they settle in to work under the all-seeing eyes of Professor Toone and Patrick, the self-doubts and questions begin to emerge. 

2."Just for the Record" – 29 September 2004
Professor Toone sets the first big assignment, and everyone bar Amy quickly finds team-mates. Amy ends up with Felix, with somewhat fiery results. Meanwhile, Calvin and Jay have fallen for Natalie, who exploits them mercilessly.			

3."Hold the Front Page" – 6 October 2004
When the Avalon girls take a stroll along the beach they get more than the ice cream they bargained for. Khush is tricked by a scheming journalist into talking about Avalon Heights.			

4."Lifestyle" – 13 October 2004
Toone decides to show the students that show business is as unpredictable and teaches the class about the beauty of change and why it's good for the mind.			

5."Radio, Radio!" – 20 October 2004
Analie and Patrick march a reluctant Khush into the studio for her turn as morning DJ. Felix seizes the chance to crash the airwaves with his own, edgier pirate station. 			

6."Charity Record" – 27 October 2004
Calvin, Frankie and Amy are shocked to find workmen preparing to build a car park over a beautiful local pond which is home to hundreds of frogs. The gang launch a protest by recording a song highlighting the frogs' plight, and enlist Natalie to help get it noticed by the press.			

7."Oliver" – 3 November 2004
A discussion about the musical Oliver leads to Felix and Ollie arguing about who's had the cushiest life. Ollie, seeking to prove his posh but tough credentials, accepts Felix's challenge to spend a week living a Dickensian deprived life in a barn. The Heights soon divides into those who have nothing in the barn and those who have far too much inside. 			

8."Together" – 10 November 2004
Music biz bigwig, Jack Smith, asks Stacey to perform at his birthday party. Natalie, Stacey and Amy form an unhappy girl band.			

9."Jay's Pirate Video" – 17 November 2004
Jay decides he wants to direct a film. Both Frankie and Natalie become convinced he's made them the leading lady. Soon everyone's taking advantage of Jay's inability to say no to give themselves a major role. 			

10."Rap-unzel" – 24 November 2004
The students work on a contemporary musical version of Rapunzel, set on a council estate. Toone gets everyone to break free of typecasting and take on a new role that is outside their comfort zone, and Ollie, appointed as director, treats his cast harshly in a bid to shake his reputation for niceness. 			

11."Living it Easy" – 1 December 2004
Patrick and Felix lock horns and Patrick doubles Felix's workload. The students defend Felix and join him in the doghouse, so they organise a strike. When Toone suggests to Patrick that he may have been too harsh, he decides to strike as well. 			

12."Families" – 8 December 2004
The students work on a drama piece about families but as they're set to perform the piece, Ollie's parents turn up unannounced and get much more of an insight into their son than they ever bargained for.			

13."Toone in Love" – 15 December 2004
Avalon Heights is in trouble and Toone thinks he'll to have to sell it. Returning from a weekend of Bhangra dancing having fallen in lovem Toone introduces his future wife but Natalie investigates her background and finds that what she might be really after has more to do with the Avalon Heights title deeds than Toone's eternal love.

Songs

"Welcome to Avalon Heights" (Prof. Toone's version), "Why Me?" (Felix, Ollie, Amy, Natalie and Khush), "Why Me?" (Ollie's version)
"Beautiful Thing" (Calvin and Jay), "Can I Trust You?" (Felix and Amy)
"Waste Your Time on Me" (Natalie), "Take Me as I Am" (Khush)
"Make a Change" (Prof. Toone, Frankie and Calvin), "I'm Here" (Ollie)
"I'm Not Coming with You" (Khush), "Goodbye Radio" (Felix)
"You're a Star" (Natalie), "Don't Steal Our Sunshine" (Frankie and Calvin)
"Sunshine" (Ollie), "Been There" (Calvin)
"Show Me the Stage" (Calvin, Aaron and Jay), "Our Life" (Stacey, Amy and Natalie)
"I Dream" (Amy), "Back Off" (Jay)
"Open Up My Heart" (Felix and Amy)
"Here Comes Summer" (Calvin), "All of the Above" (Felix)
"Higher" (Ollie), "Say It's Alright" (Ollie)
"Be My Lollie" (Prof. Toone and Lollie Das), "I Want You" (Prof. Toone and I Dreamers), "I Want You Around" (Felix and Amy)

Opening Theme: "Dreaming" (Frankie and Calvin)

Note: Rochelle Wiseman, Daisy Evans and Hannah Richings did not have a solo in any of the show's songs.

Theme song and soundtrack
The show's theme song, "Dreaming", was performed by band members Frankie and Calvin and was released as a single on 15 November 2004. It reached number nineteen on the UK Singles Chart, and was billed as 'I Dream featuring Frankie & Calvin'. On 29 November 2004 an official I Dream soundtrack album titled Welcome to Avalon Heights was released and entered the UK Albums Chart at number 133 in its first week. In France, the song "Say It's Alright" was released as a single in July 2005 and reached number 32.

References

External links
 
I Dream – Official site (now redirects to 19 Entertainment)

2000s British children's television series
2004 British television series debuts
2004 British television series endings
BBC children's television shows
S Club 8
Television series about teenagers
Television shows set in Spain